Dry Creek Township is an inactive township in Maries County, in the U.S. state of Missouri.

Dry Creek Township took its name from a creek of the same name within its borders.

References

Townships in Missouri
Townships in Maries County, Missouri